N. mollis  may refer to:
 Nepenthes mollis, the velvet pitcher-plant, a tropical pitcher plant species native to Kalimantan, Borneo
 Neurolepis mollis, a bamboo species in the genus Neurolepis

See also
 Mollis (disambiguation)